Jack Orion is the third album by Scottish folk musician Bert Jansch, released in 1966. It contains a number of traditional songs, including the epic "Jack Orion": a ten-minute adaptation of the Child ballad "Glasgerion" which tells of a court fiddler’s attempt to seduce a countess and his servant's treachery in successfully impersonating him. A number of songs are performed with friend and fellow guitarist John Renbourn, who would later join him in the group Pentangle. "The Waggoner’s Lad" has Jansch unusually playing the banjo with Renbourn supplying the guitar part.

Track listing

See also
 Folk music

References

1966 albums
Bert Jansch albums
Transatlantic Records albums
Albums produced by Bill Leader